Poliana buchholzi is a moth of the family Sphingidae. It is known from forests from western Africa to Uganda and western Kenya.

The length of the forewings is 41–45 mm. The forewings are olive grey, variously mottled with whitish and transversely banded with numerous crenulate blackish lines. The stigma is whitish and prominent. The hindwings are grey, but whitish near the tornus and the inner margin. The body is olive grey above, mottled with whitish and blackish and pink below. There are two ochreous yellow hair tufts bordered with black near the base of the abdomen above.

References

Sphingini
Moths described in 1880
Moths of Africa